Régis Ghesquière (15 July 1949 – 22 April 2015) was a Belgian decathlete.

Ghesquière was born in Mouscron in 1949. He competed for his country at the 1972 Summer Olympics in Munich, Germany where he finished in eleventh place. He returned four years later at the 1976 Summer Olympics in Montreal, Canada, but was unable to finish. He won the Belgian decathlon title four times: In 1972, 1974, 1974 and 1979.

Ghesquière died on 22 April 2015 of a heart attack.

References

External links
 Sports-reference.com

1949 births
Belgian decathletes
Athletes (track and field) at the 1972 Summer Olympics
Athletes (track and field) at the 1976 Summer Olympics
Olympic athletes of Belgium
2015 deaths
People from Mouscron
Sportspeople from Hainaut (province)